The green-backed gerygone (Gerygone chloronota) is a species of bird in the family Acanthizidae found in northern Australia and New Guinea.
Its natural habitats are subtropical or tropical moist lowland forests and subtropical or tropical mangrove forests.

References

green-backed gerygone
Birds of the Northern Territory
Birds of New Guinea
green-backed gerygone
Taxonomy articles created by Polbot